A list of the basic high school athletic districts in Louisiana (2022–2024 sports seasons):

LHSAA athletic districts

Sources:

See also
Louisiana High School Athletic Association (LHSAA)

References

External links 
 LHSAA Website

High school sports conferences and leagues in the United States
High school athletic districts
High school athletic districts